Joel Burns (born February 27, 1975) is an American professional basketball player, currently playing for the Leicester Riders in the British Basketball League.

Career
The 6'2" guard from Wisconsin attended Western Michigan University, before signing for Watford Royals in 1997. Noted as a journeyman in British basketball, Burns has played for no fewer than seven different BBL franchises, as well as a short stint in Germany. He also has British citizenship. Throughout his BBL career, Burns developed a reputation of being consistently one of the finest spot up shooters.

Career history
2007–present  Leicester Riders
2006–2007  Sheffield Sharks
2006  Scottish Rocks
2004–2006  Leicester Riders
2002–2004  Milton Keynes Lions
2001–2002  Braunschweig
2000–2001  Derby Storm
2000  Birmingham Bullets
1999–2000  Edinburgh Rocks
1998–1999  Derby Storm
1997–1998  Worthing Bears
1997  Watford Royals

References

1975 births
Living people
American emigrants to England
American expatriate basketball people in Germany
American expatriate basketball people in the United Kingdom 
Basketball Löwen Braunschweig players
Basketball players from Wisconsin
British men's basketball players
Leicester Riders players
London Lions (basketball) players
Naturalised citizens of the United Kingdom
Sheffield Sharks players
Western Michigan Broncos men's basketball players
American men's basketball players
Guards (basketball)